Holborn and St Pancras is a parliamentary constituency  in Greater London that was created in 1983. It has been represented in the House of Commons of the Parliament of the United Kingdom since 2015 by Sir Keir Starmer, the current Leader of the Labour Party and Leader of the Opposition.

Constituency profile
The seat of Holborn and St Pancras as drawn in 2010 is composed of all but a small western portion of the London Borough of Camden and extends from most of Covent Garden and Bloomsbury in the heart of the West End of London through other areas of the NW1 postal district, north and in elevation terms upwards through fashionable and economically diverse Camden Town to the affluent suburb of Highgate in a long strip.  Gospel Oak, particularly towards Kentish Town, has high deprivation levels, but the neighbouring Highgate ward has low deprivation levels.

The south part of the seat includes the University of London and several teaching hospitals, and so the constituency has a large student population.

King's Cross, St Pancras International and Euston railway termini are in the seat.

During the 20th century, the Bloomsbury, Holborn and Covent Garden, and Highgate wards overwhelmingly elected Conservative councillors. Since 2000, the wards forming the seat in its three revised forms have all swung against the Conservative Party. The 2014 local government elections (for a standard four-year term) produced one Green Party councillor, for the Highgate ward; the remaining 32 councillors whose wards fall within the seat (as redrawn in 2010) are members of the Labour Party.

Political history
The seat has been in the hands of the Labour Party since 1983. The majorities achieved have been varied between a relatively marginal 13.9% in 2005 (making it a lowest 150 seat for the party in that year by percentage of majority) to a landslide 51.7% in 2017. The 2015 result ranked the seat as the 77th safest of the party's 232 seats (by percentage majority).

Boundaries

The seat was created in 1983 as a primary successor to Holborn and St Pancras South, which was created in 1950. The seat covers the southern half of the London Borough of Camden, including all or most of Camden Town, King's Cross, Gospel Oak, Kentish Town and Bloomsbury.

The constituency has contained the following wards of the London Borough of Camden:
1983–1997
Bloomsbury, Brunswick, Camden, Castlehaven, Caversham, Chalk Farm, Gospel Oak, Grafton, Holborn, King's Cross, Regent's Park, St John's, St Pancras, and Somers Town.
1997–2010
As above, less Gospel Oak
2010–present
Bloomsbury, Camden Town with Primrose Hill, Cantelowes, Gospel Oak, Haverstock, Highgate, Holborn and Covent Garden, Kentish Town, King's Cross, Regent's Park, and St Pancras and Somers Town. (Wards renamed and redrawn before 2010 election.)

Summary of boundary review
The Fifth Periodic Review of Westminster constituencies by the Boundary Commission for England was implemented nationally in 2010. Parts of Highgate, Gospel Oak, Haverstock, and Camden Town with Primrose Hill wards were transferred from the former constituency of Hampstead and Highgate. The electorate of the new seat would have been 85,188 if it had existed in that form at the 2005 general election. The electorate has since risen further, and at the 2010 general election it was among the five highest electorates in London.

Members of Parliament

The seat was held from 1983 to 2015 by Frank Dobson of the Labour Party, who had been elected in 1979 to the predecessor seat of Holborn & St Pancras South. Dobson was the longest-serving Labour MP in London until he stood down in 2015. The constituency has been represented by Keir Starmer since the 2015 general election, who has served as Leader of the Labour Party and Leader of the Opposition since April 2020.

Election results

Elections in the 2010s

Elections in the 2000s

Elections in the 1990s

Elections in the 1980s

See also 
 List of parliamentary constituencies in London

Notes

References

External links
Guardian Politics: Holborn and St Pancras
Politics Resources (Election results from 1922 onwards)
Electoral Calculus (Election results from 1955 onwards)

Politics of the London Borough of Camden
Parliamentary constituencies in London
Constituencies of the Parliament of the United Kingdom established in 1983
Keir Starmer